Unani or Yunani medicine (Urdu:  tibb yūnānī) is Perso-Arabic traditional medicine as practiced in Muslim culture in South Asia and modern day Central Asia. Unani medicine is pseudoscientific. The Indian Medical Association describes Unani practitioners who claim to practice medicine as quacks.

The term Yūnānī means "Greek", as the Perso-Arabic system of medicine was based on the teachings of the Greek physicians Hippocrates and Galen.

The Hellenistic origin of Unani medicine is still visible in its being based on the classical four humours: phlegm, blood (dam), yellow bile (ṣafrā) and black bile (saudā'''), but it has also been influenced by Indian and Chinese traditional systems.

History

Arab and Persian elaborations upon the Greek system of medicine by figures like Ibn Sina and al-Razi influenced the early development of Unani.

Unani medicine interacted with Indian Buddhist medicine at the time of Alexander's invasion of India. There was a great exchange of knowledge at that time which is visible from the similarity of the basic conceptual frames of the two systems. The medical tradition of medieval Islam was introduced to India by the 12th century with the establishment of the Delhi Sultanate and it took its own course of development during the Mughal Empire,Kapoor, p. 7264 influenced by Indian medical teachings of Sushruta and Charaka."Interaction with China and Central Asia in the Field of Unani Medicine" by Hakim Syed Zillur Rahman, History of Science, Philosophy and Culture in Indian Civilization, Vol. III Part 2 (India’s Interaction with China, Central and West Asia), Ed. A. Rahman, Centre for Studies in Civilizations, Project of History of Indian Science, Philosophy and Culture, New Delhi, 2002, pp. 297-314 Alauddin Khalji (d. 1316) had several eminent  physicians (Hakims) at his royal courts. This royal patronage led to the development of Unani in India, and also the creation of Unani literature.Bala, p. 45

Education and recognition
There are several Indian universities devoted to Unani medicine, in addition to universities that teach traditional Indian medical practices in general. Undergraduate degrees awarded for completing an Unani program include the Bachelor of Unani Medicine and Surgery, Bachelor of Unani Tib and Surgery, and Bachelor of Unani Medicine with Modern Medicine and Surgery degrees. A small number of universities offer post-graduate degrees in Unani medicine.

The Central Council of Indian Medicine (CCIM), a statutory body established in 1971 under the Department of Ayurveda, Yoga and Naturopathy, Unani, Siddha and Homoeopathy (AYUSH), monitors higher education in areas of Indian medicine including Ayurveda, Unani, and other traditional medical systems. Another subdivision of AYUSH, the Central Council for Research in Unani Medicine (CCRUM), aids and co-ordinates scientific research in the Unani system of medicine through a network of 22 nationwide research institutes and units.

To fight biopiracy and unethical patents, the Government of India set up the Traditional Knowledge Digital Library in 2001 as repository of formulations used in Indian traditional medicine, including 98,700 Unani formulations.

In 1990, the total number of hakims or tabibs'' (practitioners of Unani medicine) in Pakistan was 51,883. The government of Pakistan's National Council for Tibb (NCT) is responsible for developing the curriculum of Unani courses and registering practitioners of the medicine. Various private foundations devote themselves to the research and production of Unani medicines, including the Hamdard Foundation, which also runs an Unani research institution. The Qarshi Foundation runs a similar institution, Qarshi University. The programs are accredited by Higher Education Commission, Pakistan Medical and Dental Council, and the Pakistan Pharmacy Council.

Criticism and safety issues
Some medicines traditionally used by Unani practitioners are known to be poisonous.

The Indian Journal of Pharmacology notes:
 According to WHO, "Pharmacovigilance activities are done to monitor detection, assessment, understanding and prevention of any obnoxious adverse reactions to drugs at therapeutic concentration that is used or is intended to be used to modify or explore physiological system or pathological states for the benefit of recipient."
 These drugs may be any substance or product including herbs, minerals, etc. for animals and human beings and can even be that prescribed by practitioners of Unani or Ayurvedic system of medicine. In recent days, awareness has been created related to safety and adverse drug reaction monitoring of herbal drugs including Unani drugs.

See also
 Ancient Greek medicine
 Ayurveda
 Iranian traditional medicine

References

External links
 Directory of History of Medicine Collection

 
History of medieval medicine
Healthcare in Pakistan
Islam in India
Pseudoscience